The women's 3000 metres steeplechase event at the 2006 World Junior Championships in Athletics was held in Beijing, China, at Chaoyang Sports Centre on 15 and 17 August.

Medalists

Results

Final
17 August

Heats
15 August

Heat 1

Heat 2

Participation
According to an unofficial count, 34 athletes from 28 countries participated in the event.

References

3000 metres steeplechasechase
Steeplechase at the World Athletics U20 Championships